Ataxolepis is a genus of flabby whalefishes found in the Pacific Ocean.

Species
There are currently two recognized species in this genus:
 Ataxolepis apus G. S. Myers & Freihofer, 1966
 Ataxolepis henactis Goodyear, 1970

References

Cetomimidae